Stadio Silvio Appiani is a multi-use stadium in Padua, Italy. It was initially used as the stadium of Calcio Padova matches.  It was replaced by Stadio Euganeo in 1994.  The capacity of the stadium was 24,000 spectators. The name is chosen in honour of Silvio Appiani. Since 2015 it is one of Calcio Padova's training grounds and hosts some youth games. The current capacity is 1,400 spectators.

External links
 Stadium information

Silvio
Silvio Appiani
Calcio Padova
Sports venues in Veneto